Alfred Gilks (29 December 1891 – 6 September 1970) was an American cinematographer from 1920 through to 1956.

Career
Gilks worked on many silent films in the 1920s, such as Red Hair (1928) with Clara Bow and the historical epic Old Ironsides (1926) starring Esther Ralston. In the latter film, he used some of the first motorized camera equipment on a production.  

He also worked on well-known sound films such as Miss Fane's Baby Is Stolen (1934), Ruggles of Red Gap (1935), several of the Dr. Kildare movies, and his Oscar-winning work on An American in Paris (1951).  His last credit was for second unit photography on John Ford's seminal The Searchers (1956).

Selected filmography

 Double Speed (1920)
Sick Abed (1920)
Her Beloved Villain (1920)
Her Husband's Trademark (1922)
Beyond the Rocks (1922)
Prodigal Daughters (1923)
Bluebeard's 8th Wife (1923)
His Children's Children (1923)
The Enchanted Hill (1926)
The Blind Goddess (1926)
Old Ironsides (1926)
Ten Modern Commandments (1927)
Figures Don't Lie (1927)
Get Your Man (1927)
Red Hair (1928)
The First Kiss (1928)
Jealousy (1929)
Secrets of the French Police (1932)
Miss Fane's Baby Is Stolen (1934)
Ruggles of Red Gap (1935)
Dancing Co-Ed (1939)
Mariona Rebull (1947)
Two Weeks with Love (1950)
Excuse My Dust (1951)
An American in Paris (1951)
The Searchers (1956)

References

External links

American cinematographers
Best Cinematographer Academy Award winners
1891 births
1970 deaths
People from Los Angeles